Oleg Anatolyevich Kurguskin (born 11 April 1966, in Elista) is a Russian  motorcycle speedway rider who was a member of Russia team at 2001 and 2005 Speedway World Cup. With Russian club Togliatti he won European Club Champions' Cup in 2003.

Kurguskin was a stand out rider when he was part of the first ever Russian team (still under the Soviet Union flag) to tour Australia in 1990/91. While the team (which included Kurguskin, Rene Aas, Michaił Starostin, Rinat Mardanshin, Rif Saitgareev, Vladimir Trofimov, Viktor Gajdym, Andrei Korolov, and Grigori Kharchenko) did not compete in a test against the Australians, they did win most of their matches around the country and won new fans with their professionalism and the way they adapted to the Australian culture.

Honours

World Championships 
 Team World Championship (Speedway World Team Cup and Speedway World Cup)
 2001 -  - 8th place (3 pts in Race-off)
 2005 - 7th place (2 pts in Event 1)
 Individual U-21 European (=World) Championship
 1987 -  Zielona Góra - 14th place (4 pts)

European Championships 

 European Club Champions' Cup
 1999 -  Bydgoszcz - 3rd place (9 pts)
 2003 -  Pardubice - European Champion (14 pts)
 2004 -  Ljubljana - Runner-up (5 pts)

See also 
 Russia national speedway team

References

External links 
 (en) (pl) Oleg Kurguskin at www.lubusports.pl

1966 births
Living people
People from Elista
Russian speedway riders
Sportspeople from Kalmykia